The Original Arizona Jean Company, known as Arizona Jean Co or Arizona Jeans is an American clothing company that manufacturers jeans and other related clothing items. It was originally founded as a private label of JCPenney. In 2008, the company became independent and is still sold at many stores including JCPenney.

References

JCPenney
Jeans by brand
American clothing
Clothing companies established in 2008